Mother Nature Network (mnn.com) was a website with news and information related to sustainability, health, lifestyle, technology, money, food, home, and family. Founded in 2009 by former marketing executive Joel Babbit and Rolling Stones keyboardist Chuck Leavell, it was the flagship property of Narrative Content Group, whose equity partners included CNN and Discovery Inc.

Content
It covers a wide range of topics beyond traditional "green" issues – including family, pets, travel, health, home, and food.

Board of directors
 Joel Babbit, CEO of Narrative Content Group and Mother Nature Network
 Thomas Bell Jr., Chairman of Mesa Capital Partners (former Chairman and CEO of Young & Rubicam and Chairman of U.S. Chamber of Commerce)
 Gerald Benjamin, co-founder and managing partner of Atlanta Equity
 A.D. "Pete" Correll, co-founder and chairman of Atlanta Equity (former Chairman and CEO of Georgia-Pacific Corporation)
 Doug Hertz, CEO of United Distributors Inc. and Partner in the Atlanta Falcons
 Chuck Leavell, Keyboardist for the Rolling Stones

Nonprofit partners
MNN has worked with a wide range of nonprofit organizations, including:

 American Farmland Trust
 Captain Planet Foundation
 Nature Conservancy
 National Wildlife Federation
 UCLA Institute of the Environment and Sustainability

References

External links
 

Internet properties established in 2009
American news websites
American environmental websites
Mass media companies established in 2009